Ludányhalászi is a village in Hungary, Nógrád county. It is the longest village in Central Europe.

External links
 Street map 

Populated places in Nógrád County